Jane Siberry is the self-titled 1981 debut album by Jane Siberry. The album was re-released on CD by East Side Records in 1994.

Siberry did not yet display the new wave pop style that would make her a household name in Canada with her next album, 1984's No Borders Here. Instead, it's a largely folk-pop album, which has been described by Stewart Mason as "Joni Mitchell's early-'70s albums viewed through a post-punk prism".

Track listing
All songs written by Jane Siberry.

"Marco Polo"  – 3:04
"This Girl I Know"  – 2:17
"The Sky Is So Blue"  – 4:10
"The Mystery at Ogwen's Farm"  – 2:57
"The Magic Beads"  – 6:42
"Writers Are a Funny Breed"  – 5:30
"The Strange Well"  – 4:53
"Above the Treeline"  – 4:26
"In the Blue Light"  – 4:19

Personnel
 Jane Siberry – vocals, harmonies, guitar, piano, synthesizer
 Carl Keesee – bass, clarinet
 John Switzer – bass, backing vocals
 David Bradstreet – electric 12-string guitar, kick drum, backing vocals
 David Houghton – drums
 Trevor Ferrier - congas on "The Strange Well"
 Bruce Fowler - synthesizer on "The Magic Beads"
Brenda Scott, Goldie Sherman, Sarah Farquhar - backing vocals 
Technical
Chad Irschick - mixing
Brenda Scott - design, graphics
John Switzer - photography

References

1981 debut albums
Jane Siberry albums